New Play Project is a non-profit organization founded in Provo, Utah, by four Brigham Young University students. NPP is dedicated to writing and producing new plays that reflect the standards of a Utah Valley audience. They also aim to give emerging Latter-day Saint writers a place to produce their work while maintaining their standards and values. It primarily produces short play festivals (several short plays bound together by one theme), but occasionally takes on larger projects (as in Really Cool and Smart and Better Than You and Swallow the Sun). It is the first such organization to flourish in the area (which is known for theater performance), and has produced more than 70 original plays (and workshopped more than 200) since its inception in 2006.

Origins 
New Play Project was founded April 2006 by Brigham Young University students James Goldberg, Arisael Rivera, Julie Saunders and Jennefer Franklin as an attempt to produce new play scripts they developed. Bianca Dillard almost immediately joined the group and developed the continuing workshop program.

In August 2006, sponsored by the BYU Experimental Theatre Group, it held its first production, a 10-minute play festival titled Love Songs and Negotiations. In October 2006 it held another play festival titled Palms, which featured plays revolving around religious themes. At the beginning of December 2006, it held its last play festival of the year titled In Progress.

In 2007, New Play Project officially separated itself from BYU and was incorporated with the state of Utah as a 501(c)3 non-profit organization. The next seven shows were performed in Provo City Library's Bullock Room. In December 2007, New Play Project moved to its current home at 105 N. 100 East: Provo Theatre Company's building.

Core programs 
Playwright workshop
NPP has a weekly program where any playwright can submit plays to be "workshopped." These plays are read out loud, discussed and critiqued for the playwright's benefit. The workshop functions as a classroom for the attending writers and actors to explore and understand the principles of writing a good story.

Themed short play festivals
Approximately every ten weeks, New Play Project produces a collection of short plays centered on a theme. A script selection committee chooses the best plays submitted for the production, directors and actors are found and the plays are rehearsed and performed. Playwrights are allowed to make improvements to their scripts during the rehearsal process.

Religious plays program
Twice a year, New Play Project accepts submissions of religious-themed plays, most of which are LDS. NPP feels it is very important there is a place for Mormon playwrights to write their own religious experiences using their own religious terminology.

Recognition 
The goal of New Play Project is to not only create positive, uplifting media for local audiences, but to create great writers who can make a difference in the mass media. In 2007, two NPP writers' works were chosen for Specific Gravity Ensemble's Elevator Plays. SGE is a Louisville, KY-based theater company.

Development 
Part of New Play Project's goal is education. They work to develop new writers, actors, and directors, and hone their skills. They do this both through play writing workshops and through their short play productions.

Writing
Writing is the most important aspect of New Play Project. The heart of NPP is new work. NPP welcomes submissions from anyone for their themed productions. If submitted early before deadlines, the directors are willing to give feedback, and even have a workshop program for playwrights trying to develop both their short and full-length scripts.

Acting
Because NPP generally produces short plays, actors sometimes only need to spend 2–5 hours per week in rehearsal and have a much lower memorization burden than in most plays. No previous acting experience is required, and directors work with actors to develop good acting skills.

Directing
As with acting, the ten-minute play format provides opportunities for many beginning and experienced directors without the time-consumption of managing and blocking a full-length production. Previous directing or acting experience is required for directors, and NPP generally gives preference to those who have worked on previous NPP production (in any capacity).

Dramaturgy
NPP also includes dramaturgs in its productions. In NPP, dramaturgs help find additional information and images that help the director and actors better understand the script in terms of its larger context. They also create written and visual aids to help audience members connect the script to issues in their own lives and the world around them. Dramaturgs also help during the script development process to give articulate feedback on scripts to improve them. They are heavily utilized in the play writing workshop program.

Past shows

2006
 Love Songs & Negotiations
 Palms
 In Progress

2007
 A New Leaf
 Beneath the Surface
 That They Might Have Joy
 Really Cool and Smart and Better Than You by Arisael Rivera
 All's Fair
 On the Road
 Roots
 Thorns & Thistles
 America

2008
 Eccentricities
 Lost and Found
 Swallow the Sun by Mahonri Stewart
 Long Ago and Far Away
 Bread of Affliction with BYU experimental theater club
 Fire & Rain
 God for President by Katherine Gee
 Uneaten Cantaloupe by Mahonri Stewart
 Games We Play

2009
 Do You Love Me?
 Little Happy Secrets by Melissa Leilani Larson
 Reaching

2010
 The Bent Sword Musical by Stephen Gashler

2011
 He & She Fighting by Eric Samuelson
 WWJD by Anna Lewis

Out of the Mount
In 2010, Davey Morrison edited a collection of NPP's work, Out of the Mount: 19 from New Play Project, published by Peculiar Pages. The book allowed NPP's work to travel outside of Utah; it "ably makes its claim as one of the most ambitious and vibrant going concerns in the world of LDS culture."

See also
 Eric Samuelsen
 Melissa Leilani Larson

Notes 

Arts organizations established in 2006
Mormon studies
Provo, Utah
Theatre companies in Utah
2006 establishments in Utah